The chief medical advisor to the president is a position within the White House Office, which is part of the Executive Office of the President of the United States. Established in 2019, the position has been vacant since Dec. 31, 2022, when Anthony Fauci stepped down.

History 
The position was established in 2019 by the Trump administration. On February 2, 2019, former physician to the president Ronny Jackson was selected to serve as chief medical advisor and assistant to President Donald Trump. Jackson's job included advising Trump on public health policy. Jackson left at the end of 2019, and the Trump administration did not name a successor.

On December 4, 2020, the transition team of the incoming Biden administration announced that Anthony Fauci, then the director of the National Institute of Allergy and Infectious Diseases, would serve in the role. Fauci stepped into the job on Jan. 21, 2021, the day after Biden took office.  Fauci advised on public health policy related to the COVID-19 pandemic. On August 22, 2022, Fauci announced that he would step down from his position in December. He stepped down on December 31 of that same year.

Chief medical advisors

References 

Executive Office of the President of the United States
Health in the United States